New Cuyama (Chumash: Kuyam, meaning "Clam") is a census-designated place in the Cuyama Valley, Santa Barbara County, California. It was named after the Chumash word for "clams", most likely due to the millions of petrified prehistoric clamshell fossils that are found in the surrounding areas. The town is home to the majority of the utility infrastructure for its residents, including nearby neighbor Cuyama, California. New Cuyama is located very close to the intersection points for Santa Barbara, San Luis Obispo, Ventura and Kern counties. The town is served by Highway 166 (connecting U.S. Route 101 and Interstate 5) and the public-use New Cuyama Airport. The population was 542 at the 2020 census.

History
The area was considered territory of the Yokuts people, but Chumash Indians from the Pacific Coast are also known to have frequented the area. The imprint of an old Indian trail can still be seen leading over the hills of present-day Ventura County to the headwaters of Piru Creek. The name "Cuyama" comes from an Indian village named for the Chumash word kuyam, meaning "clam" or "freshwater mollusk".

The area's recorded history dates to 1822, when Mexico won independence from Spain and took over the Spanish colony of Alta California. Two Mexican land grants, the Rancho Cuyama (Lataillade) and Rancho Cuyama (Rojo), were granted in the 1840s by Governors Manuel Micheltorena and Pío Pico in the lower Cuyama Valley along the Cuyama River, where present-day New Cuyama is, privatizing ownership of the land.

Much of the infrastructure from ARCO's settling of the town still exists today and is used by town residents. The original ARCO-built gas processing plant is still in use and easily seen due south of New Cuyama, though ARCO has since sold off interest in the facility.

The town of New Cuyama, at its founding, was considered the pearl of eastern Santa Barbara County, due to the flow of oil that was coming out of the region. During this time Richfield Oil Company built the town funded schools and provided all the important utilities other than electricity. Now that oil and gas production have declined, the principal industry is once again agriculture.

Geography 
New Cuyama is located at  (34.947933, -119.68915). It is situated in the Cuyama Valley.

According to the United States Census Bureau, the CDP covers an area of 0.7 square miles (1.8 km), all of it land.

Climate
New Cuyama has a steppe climate (BSk). This region experiences hot and dry summers, with the warmest month having a daily mean of 75 degrees.

Demographics
The 2010 United States Census reported that New Cuyama had a population of 517. The racial makeup of New Cuyama was 418 (80.9%) White, 3 (0.6%) African American, 14 (2.7%) Native American, 3 (0.6%) Asian, 0 (0.0%) Pacific Islander, 53 (10.3%) from other races, and 26 (5.0%) from two or more races. Hispanic or Latino of any race were 234 persons (45.3%).

The Census reported that 517 people (100% of the population) lived in households, 0 (0%) lived in non-institutionalized group quarters, and 0 (0%) were institutionalized.

There were 177 households, out of which 69 (39.0%) had children under the age of 18 living in them, 95 (53.7%) were opposite-sex married couples living together, 15 (8.5%) had a female householder with no husband present, 12 (6.8%) had a male householder with no wife present. There were 15 (8.5%) unmarried opposite-sex partnerships, and 1 (0.6%) same-sex married couples or partnerships. 45 households (25.4%) were made up of individuals, and 20 (11.3%) had someone living alone who was 65 years of age or older. The average household size was 2.92. There were 122 families (68.9% of all households); the average family size was 3.54.

The population was spread out, with 160 people (30.9%) under the age of 18, 43 people (8.3%) aged 18 to 24, 125 people (24.2%) aged 25 to 44, 126 people (24.4%) aged 45 to 64, and 63 people (12.2%) who were 65 years of age or older. The median age was 35.1 years. For every 100 females, there were 105.2 males. For every 100 females age 18 and over, there were 97.2 males.

The homeowner vacancy rate was 1.7%; the rental vacancy rate was 9.2%. 313 people (60.5% of the population) lived in owner-occupied housing units and 204 people (39.5%) lived in rental housing units.

See also
Ranchos of California

References

External links 

Cuyama Joint Unified School District
Wandering Lizard Cuyama Valley Photographs
Ranchos of Santa Barbara County Map

Census-designated places in Santa Barbara County, California
Cuyama Valley
Populated places established in 1822
1822 establishments in Alta California
Census-designated places in California